Fudbalski klub Sloboda Užice is a Serbian professional football club from Užice. They are currently playing in the Serbian First League, the second tier of Serbian football.

History

Early years (1920s and 1930s)
The club was founded through the initiative of Užice's workers in 1925, as part of the sports society named URSK Sloboda (Užički radnički sportski klub Sloboda, English: Užice's worker's sport klub Sloboda). The founders were communist activists Miloš Marković (who was two years earlier the founder of Radnički Niš) and Josip Šiber. From the very beginning, football had a priority over other sports in the newly founded sports society. The first official match was played on 24 June 1926 against Mladi Radnik from Kragujevac ending in a 2–2 draw. In the 1928–29 season, the club began participating in the regional Western Morava county league, along with other area clubs such as FK Era from Užice, Car Lazar and Obilić from Kruševac, Ibar from Kraljevo, Jedinstvo from Čačak and Takovo from Gornji Milanovac. In 1929, the club officially got accepted under the umbrella of the Yugoslav Football Association as well as the Worker's Sports Union. Due to financial difficulties, the club didn't compete in the early 1930s, playing only friendly matches. The club scaled down its football activities in this period, turning its focus towards politics. Due to its ties to worker unions, the club got infiltrated by members and sympathizers of the banned Yugoslav Communist Party (KPJ), becoming in essence the focal point for communist activity in the city of Užice. Authorities reacted by forcing the club to drop the term "radnički" (reference to workers) from its name in early 1932. For the May Day that year, Sloboda's co-founder Josip Šiber placed the Red flag on the club's facilities. While the authorities conducted an investigation into the event, the flag re-appeared on the cliff overlooking the city. In December 1932, Sloboda ended up losing its license by the national police of the Kingdom of Yugoslavia and was forced to shut down because of "spreading communist ideas". Soon after, the club resumed its activities under new name – USK Građanski (Užički sportski klub Građanski) – which was the authorities' attempt to distance the club from its ties to workers as well as fostering a new civic identity. FK Era, the other club from the city, merged into Građanski. In the 1936–37 season, Građanski became champion of the regional Western Morava county league, but still failed to qualify to the national level second-tier Yugoslav Second League, losing the playoff tie. During those qualification matches, the club supporters traveled by bus to Kragujevac to support their team against the local club Erdoglija in what is considered to be the first supporters trip outside Užice. In 1938, the club was again banned by the authorities, but a year later, the ban got lifted, and the club continued this time under yet another new name Budućnost. However, the Second World War began soon. During the occupation of the country by Axis forces, the club didn't have any activity, and most of its players participated in fighting to liberate the country. Many of them perished during the war.

Post World War II (1945–1991)

On 5 May 1945, the club was reestablished under its original name Sloboda, which means freedom (or liberty) in Serbian, and was now named FK Sloboda Titovo Užice (City of Užice was renamed to Titovo Užice). Next year the club won the local league and played for several years in the regional Serbian League. After the restructure of the football association, it became a member of the Kragujevac sub-division of the football federation. Until 1947, the club played its matches on the field in Krčagovo, but from then on began playing in a new stadium in Begluk, where under floodlights played its first night match against Metalac Belgrade. In 1956, the club reached its greatest achievement until then, by playing in the so-called IV Zone League (one of the 5 leagues forming the Yugoslav Second League) among other teams like Radnički Niš, Radnički Kragujevac, Rabotnički Skopje, Pobeda Prilep, Trepča Kosovska Mitrovica and others. The club suffered relegation after that season, but in that period it managed to accomplish some stability as regular participant in the Kragujevac Association League. In the 1962–63 season, Sloboda played the qualifications for the Yugoslav Second League against FK Bor, and after each team winning its home matches by 2–0, the final was played in Belgrade's JNA stadium, where it failed to win.

It was finally in its fourth attempt, in 1965, that the club managed to qualify to the Yugoslav Second League as second-place team in the Serbian League group South. In the qualifications it managed to overcome Belgrade's Železnik and Tetovo's Teteks. One of the club's most memorable nights during this period came on 19 February 1967, when the club held Yugoslavia's most successful club, Red Star Belgrade to a 1–1 draw in the Yugoslav Cup before losing 1–2 in extra time in front of 14,000 spectators. The following two seasons are remembered by the fans as the most successful until then. The club managed to conclude the first half of the championship in first place in both seasons, but on both occasions failed to reach the First League qualifications at the end.

Following this period, the league was restructured and some poor results saw the club drop down to the Serbian League (Yugoslav 3rd tier) where they remained until 1980, when it was promoted to the Yugoslav Second League East (the Second League was back then divided into two groups, East and West). Promotion was achieved with a crushing win over FK Topličanin by 5–0. In this period the club achieved stability, and in the 1987–88 season by finishing in the top half of the league table achieved qualification to the newly formed unified Second League. In this period, the late 1980s, the level of football played in Yugoslavia is by many considered the best ever.

First League of Yugoslavia and stagnation (1991–2010)
In the 1991–92 season, the club was at the top of the Second League for a long period, but at the end failed to gain promotion to the top league, achieving that in the following season, 1992–93 and qualified to play in the First League of FR Yugoslavia for the 1993–94 time. Despite wins in Čačak against Borac by 4–1, and in Pljevlja against Rudar by 1–0, because of the restructuring of the league it only played in 1995 against the best teams of the First League.

In June 1995, it managed to stay in the First League by winning in the promotion/relegation matches the Second League FK Novi Pazar in Novi Pazar in a penalty shoot-out. The following season, 1995–96 it ended in 4th place in the B First League, qualifying to play in the A First League in the second part of the championship. But, at the end, it finished last, despite wins against Proleter Zrenjanin and Mladost Lučani.

In the following seasons the club suffered a series of relegations, and despite few participations in the Second League, the club ended up mostly playing in the Serbian League (third national tier) during the 2000s.

Merging with Sevojno and Serbian SuperLiga (2010–present)
In 2010 the club announced it merged with FK Sevojno, which had just been promoted to the Serbian SuperLiga, and from then the club played in the SuperLiga, under the new name FK Sloboda Point Sevojno, until the name Sloboda Užice was restored as the club's official name on 13 October 2011. In their first ever season, in the highest tier of Serbian football, they finished sixth, nine places off the relegation zone. They finished the 2011–12 Serbian SuperLiga season fifth and almost achieved Europa League qualifications. The 2012–13 Sloboda Užice season was the same they finished fifth for the second year straight. Also the 12–13 season will be remembered as the negative tradition breaking season. They won against FK Rad at home after 30 years, they achieved their first ever win over Serbian giants Red Star Belgrade away at Marakana, they won against FK Radnički Niš on Čair for the first time and they also won against FK Radnički 1923 away after 47 years. The following season the club got relegated from the SuperLiga on the final matchday after a 1–0 loss to Voždovac at home. Originally the club was meant to be playing in the Serbian League West in the 2016–17 season, with finishing 13th the previous season and getting relegated, but due to the exclusion of Sloga PM the club kept their First League status. In 2019, after five turbulent seasons in the First League, Sloboda got relegated to the Morava Zone League, fourth tier of Serbian football and was renamed in GFK Sloboda. In 2022, the club got promoted back to the First League, by winning the Serbian League West.

Stadium

The Užice City Stadium is a multi-purpose stadium and Sloboda's home ground. The stadium has a capacity of 15,000 spectators. In July 2013 it was announced that the stadium will have floodlights for the first time in club history.The first game under the floodlights was played against Partizan on 14 September 2013.

Supporters

The organized supporters of Sloboda Užice are known as "Freedom Fighters". The members of Freedom Fighters call themselves also "Slobodaši". They express their love for their city, club and region with many creative activities. The Slobodaši hold firmly to Serbian traditional values and are known as real supporters where sporting spirit is a priority. They are also well known for their fair behavior in the stands and their commitment to humanitarian aid. The basis of their support mainly includes chants, the use of flags, choreography and the display of banners. A well-known slogan of the Freedom Fighters is "Sloboda počinje".

Recent seasons (1996–present)

Current squad

Technical staff
Updated 30 June 2020

Kit manufacturers and shirt sponsors

Notable former players
To appear in this section a player must have either:
 Played at least 100 games in Serbian top league.
 Set a club record or won an individual award while at the club.
 Played at least one international match for their national team at any time.

  Radomir Antić
  Dušan Arsenijević
  Milan Čančarević
  Dragan Ćulum
  Slobodan Dogandžić
  Milovan Đorić
  Ljubinko Drulović
  Branko Gavrilović
  Tihomir Jelisavčić
  Ratko Jokić
  Zlatko Krdžević
  Petar Krivokuća
  Rešad Kunovac
  Nikola Maksimović
  Đuro Marić
  Miloš Marić
  Nenad Markićević
  Zoran Njeguš
  Goran Pandurović
  Miroslav Pavlović
  Dragan Pejić
  Milojko Pivljaković
  Predrag Ranđelović
  Saša Simić
  Uroš Stamatović
  Srboljub Stamenković
  Mihajlo Vasović
  Nemanja Vidić (youth)
  Dragoljub Vitić
  Mirko Vitić
  Miroslav Vukašinović
  Ivan Vukomanović
  Aleksandar Vulović
  Milan Živadinović
  Dario Purić
  Tiago Galvão
  Mirsad Omerhodžić
  Tomáš Poláček
  Vladan Vićević
  Francis Bossman
  Omega Roberts
  Darko Božović
  Filip Kasalica
  Kevin Amuneke
  Darko Micevski
  Maroš Klimpl
  Nuriddin Davronov

For the list of current and former players with Wikipedia article, please see: :Category:FK Sloboda Užice players.

Coaching history
List of coaches.

  Krešimir Arapović
  Đorđe Kačunković (1965)
  Ćosić (1970–71)
  Terzić (1971)
  Marković (1972)
  Vukotić (1972–73)
  Dušan Radonjić (1988–91)
  Ivan Čančarević (1991)
  Miroslav Vukašinović (1992)
  Ivan Čančarević (1992–94)
  Željko Berić (1994)
  Slobodan Dogandžić (1995)
  Milovan Rajevac (1995–96)
  Jestratije Jovanović (1996)
  Slobodan Jagodić (1996)
  Milenko Radivojević (1997)
  Slobodan Dogandžić (1997)
  Ratko Jokić (1997–98)
  Slavoljub Dimitrijević (1998)
  Slavko Vojčić (1999)
  Jestratije Jovanović (1999)
  Milan Čančarević (2003–04)
  Zoran Ristanović (2004)
  Predrag Ristanović (2004–07)
  Slobodan Dogandžić (2007)
  Željko Berić (2008)
  Ivan Čančarević (2008–09)
  Zoran Njeguš (2009–10)
  Ljubiša Stamenković (2010–14)
  Ljubiša Dmitrović (2014)
  Ivan Janjić (caretaker) (2014)
  Milenko Kiković (2014–15)
  Predrag Ristanović (2015–17)
  Goran Đukić (2017–18)
  Milan Bosanac (2018)
  Jovo Čučković (2018)
  Predrag Marić (2018)
  Slobodan Dogandžić (2019)
  Jovan Nikitović (2019–20)
  Slavko Matić (2020)
  Goran Đukić (2020–22)
  Vladan Vićević (2022)
  Zoran Kostić (2022–)

References

External links
  
 Unofficial website 

Other:
 New stadium in Uzice 

 
Football clubs in Serbia
Football clubs in Yugoslavia
Association football clubs established in 1925
1925 establishments in Serbia
1925 establishments in Yugoslavia
Sport in Užice